OPT Circuit is a series of ITF Pro Circuit event being played across the MENA region.

About
Opt Circuit is a concept created by OPT Sport, that organizes a series of tennis events under the sanction of the International Tennis Federation, across the MENA region.

All OPT Circuit tournaments are open to all tennis players based on merit and without discrimination subject only to the conditions laid down in the ITF Pro Circuit Rule Book.

Futures
In the late 1990s, the ITF introduced Futures tournaments, allowing for greater flexibility in the organization of the tournaments for national associations, and participation in tournaments for players. Over time, the ratio of Futures tournaments to satellites increased until 2007, when satellites were eliminated.

Futures tournaments allow for players to win career titles and improve their rankings. Futures are held in both singles and doubles, and last only one week. As of 2008, the prize fund for each tournament is either US$10,000 or US$15,000. Some tournaments also provide housing for participants. Futures usually have sizable qualifying draws, which allow unranked players to enter tournaments and earn ATP ranking points.

Tournaments

2015

2014

Accumulated Circuit Points
This is a unique feature of OPT Circuit, which allows players to earn cash rewards at the end of the season, for the achievements on OPT Circuit tournaments.

All ATP ranking points achieved by a player in various OPT Circuit tournaments is added to the players profile, and at the end of the year, the player's with the highest Accumulated Circuit Points are rewarded.

Rankings explained
 Players must play on at least 12 Circuit events to qualify for the Accumulated Circuit points system.
 The best 10 results of each player's single competition is accounted towards their accumulated circuit points.

Rewards

Current ranking

References

External links 
 www.optcircuit.com

International Tennis Federation